Juliana Cannarozzo (born August 27, 1989) is an American former competitive figure skater and actress. She won two gold medals on the ISU Junior Grand Prix series.

Personal life
Juliana Cannarozzo was born in Boston, Massachusetts and raised in Reading, Massachusetts. Her older sister, Lauren Cannarozzo, was also a competitive skater.

Skating career
During her career, Cannarozzo trained at the Skating Club of Boston and was coached by Mark Mitchell and Peter Johansson. She made her Junior Grand Prix debut in the 2005–06 season and won two bronze medals. She just missed out qualifying for the Junior Grand Prix Final. At the 2006 U.S. Championships, she placed 5th on the junior level.

In the 2006–07 season, Cannarozzo won two gold medals on the 2006–07 ISU Junior Grand Prix circuit, which qualified her for the Junior Grand Prix Final, where she placed seventh. Her qualification for the Final gave her a bye to the 2007 U.S. Championships. She made her senior debut at Nationals and placed 7th. She was the third alternate for the 2007 World Championships, the 2007 World Junior Championships, and the 2007 Four Continents Championships.

Cannarozzo dealt with injuries during the 2007–08 season. She competed twice on the Junior Grand Prix, placing 4th and 12th at her events. At the Eastern Sectional Championships, the last step in qualifying for the 2008 U.S. Championships, she placed 7th and did not qualify for Nationals.

Cannarozzo retired from competitive skating following the 2007–08 season. She then toured with Holiday on Ice in Europe. She currently performs as the primary soloist in the ice skating show Turn It Up! at Busch Gardens Tampa Bay.

Acting career
Cannarozzo played the role of Zoey Bloch in the Disney movie Ice Princess. She has also appeared in commercials in Taiwan.

Programs

Competitive highlights

References

External links
 
 
 

1989 births
Figure skaters from Boston
American female single skaters
American child actresses
Living people
American film actresses
21st-century American women